Bingo is a department in the province of Boulkiemdé, west of Ouagadougou, the capital of Burkina Faso. As of 2005, it had a population of 16,541. Bingo is the capital of the department.

Bingo was a location in the American television series The Amazing Race 12 (2007).

Towns and villages
BingoBisraagaGuilléKaligriKoangaKoulgorinSâSapeloSilgoTanghinVillaZékemzougou

References

Departments of Burkina Faso
Bingo